Skateistan is an international non-profit organization that uses skateboarding and education to empower children. Over 2,500 children, aged 5–17, attend Skateistan's programs in Afghanistan, Cambodia and South Africa. 50% of students are girls. Through their innovative programs, Outreach, Skate and Create, Back-to-School, Dropping In and Youth Leadership, Skateistan aims to give children the opportunity to become leaders for a better world. Skateistan has Skate Schools in Kabul and Mazar-e-Sharif, Afghanistan; Phnom Penh, Cambodia; and Johannesburg, South Africa. The international headquarters is in Berlin, Germany.

History

The idea of Skateistan began in 2007 when Australian Oliver Percovich arrived in Kabul, Afghanistan, with three skateboards and began skateboarding in the streets with children. Percovich perceived the lack of opportunities for young Afghans, especially girls and working children, and realized that skateboarding was a way to engage them and build community. Skateistan took shape in the following years, with the help of international donors and skateboard industry partners. It was officially registered as an Afghan NGO in July 2009.

On October 29, 2009 in Kabul, Skateistan officially opened their first Skate School within a 1750 m2 facility that includes classrooms, offices, a sport court and the indoor skatepark. A second Skate School was opened in northern Afghanistan in May 2013, in the city of Mazar-e-Sharif.

Skateistan has since grown to run their programs for children beyond Afghanistan. In 2011 Skateistan Cambodia was founded in Phnom Penh, and in 2014 Skateistan South Africa was founded in Johannesburg.

In 2012, Skateistan moved its international administrative headquarters from Kabul, Afghanistan, to Berlin, Germany.

Skateistan officially opened its Skate School in Johannesburg on August the 14th 2016.

In February 2018, Skateistan opened a new Skate School in Phnom Penh, Cambodia. The facility consists of a 500 m2 skatepark, a classroom, library, office and large green space.

On April 11, 2018, Skateistan celebrated its 10th birthday marking 10 years of empowering children and youth through skateboarding and education in Afghanistan, Cambodia and South Africa.

After the Afghan government fell to the Taliban in August 2021, the Skateistan schools in the country were shut down. Percovich has said he would like to restart Skateistan in Afghanistan, but can't do so until it's safe.

Overview

Skateistan's programs are for children 5 to 17 years of age with a big focus on inclusion for girls, children with disabilities, and children from low-income backgrounds. The core programs work to keep children involved in the Skateistan community for the long term. As participants get older, they can become role models for the younger children and the wider community.

Their mission is to empower children through skateboarding and education.

What they do: Programs
 Outreach

Outreach sessions take place both at the Skate Schools and in the local communities. Educators and Youth Leadership participants head out with skateboards and sports equipment to engage with local children, providing an hour of recreational activity. It is often the first time they will try skateboarding, or other sports and their first contact with Skateistan. Skateistan also develops partnerships with child protection agencies in order to connect youth and their families with important social services. Through Outreach sessions, many students go on to register for the Skate and Create or Back-to-School program.

 Skate and Create
This 2-hour program consists of weekly skateboarding classes and an educational arts-based curriculum. In the classroom, Skateistan Educators use creative arts to teach a variety of topics, including human rights, cultural studies, nutrition and the environment. Lessons give youth tools to express themselves, think critically and develop confidence. In the skatepark, students find a valuable platform for self-expression and personal development. Accessible to all levels of literacy and education, Skate and Create provides a safe space for youth to develop friendships that overcome deep social barriers.

 Dropping In

The Dropping In program provides learning spaces and resources where students can develop their aspirations and navigate their potential. Children ‘drop in’ for organized skateboarding and sports sessions, read in the Skate School libraries, join weekly book clubs and study groups, or use computers and quiet spaces to study.  Even when public school is not in session, holiday programs, field trips, and events keep students learning and moving ahead.

 Back to School

Back-to-School is a program to support children in their pursuit of formal education. In Afghanistan, this is a fast-tracked learning program for children who are out of school. Students come to the Skate School five days a week to attend classes covering the national public curriculum. Upon completing the program, Skateistan enrolls students into public school, usually in the 3rd or 4th grade. In South Africa and Cambodia, the program takes place outside of school hours, where students can “drop in” and receive homework help and guidance with career and further education planning.

 Youth Leadership

Motivated older students at Skateistan can apply to join the Youth Leadership training program, assisting the Educators in classes, mentoring younger students, building their skill sets and planning local events. This program helps young people to develop a sense of ownership at the Skate Schools and creates role models for the other students and wider community.

Skateistan runs programs at their Skate Schools, Outreach locations and with partner organizations in Afghanistan, Cambodia, and South Africa. Skateistan Educators run programs 5 days a week, reaching more than 2500 children.

International activities

Non-Profit Status
Skateistan has charitable status in:
 Germany
 UK
 USA (501c3)

There are Skateistan NGOs registered in:
 Afghanistan (Afghanistan Skateboarding Training Organization - Skateistan)
 Cambodia (Skateistan Cambodia)
 South Africa (Skateistan South Africa)

Media coverage
Skateistan has been featured in thousands of media pieces around the world. It has appeared in most major media outlets including The New York Times, Foreign Policy, The Economist, Al Jazeera, The Telegraph and The Guardian. In 2020, a short documentary about Skateistan, 'Learning to Skateboard in a Warzone (if you're a girl)' won the BAFTA for British Short Film and the Academy Award for Best Documentary Short.

Locations
 Skateistan Kabul (Afghanistan, 2007–present)
 Skateistan Cambodia  (Phnom Penh, 2011–present)
 Skateistan Mazar-e-Sharif (Afghanistan, 2013–present)
 Skateistan South Africa  (Johannesburg, 2014–present)

Recognition

Documentaries
Several documentaries about Skateistan have been released:
 In 2010, a 9-minute short documentary entitled "Skateistan: To Live and Skate Kabul"  was released by director Orlando von Einsiedel on the Internet.
 In 2011, a full-length documentary entitled "Skateistan: Four Wheels and a Board in Kabul" premiered at the Santa Barbara film festival in the United States. It was directed by Kai Sehr.
 In 2016, a short documentary, "The Skateboard and The City" was released covering their Skate School opening in Johannesburg, directed by Coral Brown.
 In 2017, Skateistan released "Land of Skate", shot by Ghost Digital Cinema. 
 In 2020, "Learning to Skateboard in a Warzone (if you're a girl)", directed by Carol Dysinger and Elena Andreicheva won the Oscar for Documentary (Short Subject), and BAFTA for Short Film.

Publications
 2012- The Tale of Skateboarding in Afghanistan, Published by Skateistan,

Awards

2020: 
IOC Women and Sport Award

2019: 

Inspiration Award at Esquire Middle East Awards.
.ORG Impact Award in the ‘Best Integrated Marketing Campaign’ category

2018:

 HundrED Top 100 Innovators in Education

2017:

 We Work Creator Award, Berlin

2016:

 NGO Advisor - Top 500 NGO's Worldside - #67
2015:
 "Eric Stricker Memorial" Award from Transworld Skateboarding Magazine
2014:
 "Champion of Learning through Play" Award from ASHOKA and LEGO Foundation
 "Frankin Paine's Skatepark Fund" Award for social justice through skateboarding
2013:
 #85 in The Global Journal's "Top 100 NGOs" for 2013
 Winner of the "UNICEF Sport for Education" Award at Beyond Sport Forum
2012:
 Winner of Beyond Sport "Innovation through Sport" Award
 Shortlisted for the Beyond Sport "Social Inclusion" Award
 Winner of ISPO Marketing and Social Awareness Award
2011:
 Winner of Peace and Sport "Image of the Year" Award
 Shortlisted for the Beyond Sport "Conflict Resolution" and "Sport for Education" Awards
 Sundance Film Festival screens "Skateistan: To Live and Skate Kabul"
 "Most Valuable Documentary" at Cinema for Peace Festival in Berlin for feature-length Skateistan documentary "Four Wheels and a Board in Kabul
 Winner of ISPO Brandnew Social Awareness Award
2010:
 "Best Documentary" at L.A. Skate Film Festival for Skateistan short film
 Sappi Design Award "Ideas that Matter"
2009:
 Winner of Peace and Sport Award "NGO of the Year"
 Recipient of Gamechangers/Architecture for Humanity "Architecture for Sport with a Social Outcome" Award
 Golden "Dove of Peace" (UN initiative)

References

External links
 
 Skateistan: To Live And Skate Kabul - short movie following a group of young skateboarders in Afghanistan

Child-related organisations in Afghanistan
Skateboarding
Organisations based in Kabul
Skateboarding organizations
Organizations established in 2007
2007 establishments in Afghanistan